Scotland at the 1994 Commonwealth Games was represented by the Commonwealth Games Council for Scotland (CGCE).

Scotland joined the Commonwealth of Nations as part of the United Kingdom in 1931.

In this competition Scotland finished seventh in the medals table behind India and Kenya.

Athletics

Gold
 Yvonne Murray, Woman's 10,000 metres

Bronze
 Geoff Parsons, Men's High jump

Bowls

Gold
 Richard Corsie, Men's singles
 Robert Brand, Men's Visually Impaired Singles
 Sarah Gourlay & Frances Whyte, Pairs

Bronze
 Gary Smith & Andy Thompson, Men's Pairs
 Norma Shaw, Women's Singles
 Banda Atherton & Mary Price, Women's Pairs
 Margret Lynne, Women's Visually Impaired Singles

Boxing

Gold
 Paul Shepherd, Flyweight

Silver
 John Wilson, Light Heavyweight

Bronze
 Joseph Townsley, Light Middleweight

Gymnastics

Bronze
Rhythmic
 Joanne Walker, All around
Team Event

Shooting

Gold
 Shirley McIntosh , Woman Small Bore Rifle, Prone (Rifle)

Silver
 Alister Allan & William Murray, Men's Small Bore Rifle, Three Positions - Pairs
 Shirley McIntosh & Patricia Littlechild, Woman Small Bore Rifle, Prone - Pairs

Bronze
 Alister Allan , Men's Small Bore Rifle, Three Positions
 David Rattray & Robin Law, Men's Air Rifle - Pairs
 Patricia Littlechild , Woman's Small Bore Rifle, Prone
 Michael Thomson & Ian Marsden, Woman's Skeet - Pairs

Swimming

Bronze
 Fraser Walker, Men's 200 individual medley

Wrestling

Bronze
 Calum McNeil, Welterweight
 Graeme English, Light Heavyweight

External links
 1994 Commonwealth Games - Commonwealth Games official website
  Commonwealth Games Medalists - GB Athletics Full list of Commonwealth Games Medalists

Scotland at the Commonwealth Games
Commonwealth Games
Nations at the 1994 Commonwealth Games